The word  titling, in the performing arts (opera, drama, audiovisual productions), defines the work of linguistic mediation encompassing subtitling and surtitling.

History
Subtitling developed starting from 1917, during the silent film era, whereas surtitling has been used in the live performing arts since 1983 (at the dawning of digital systems).
With the appearance of new information systems, which opened the door to multilingual titling terminological debate started, too.
In the audiovisual system, even when more than one language was used, subtitles maintained their position unchanged for many years. The newest software technologies for mobile devices, which came out as an alternative to subtitling in cinemas, or the possibilities opened up by head-mounted displays, such as subtitle glasses, have made a revision of the technical terminology necessary also in the field of those performing arts that are reproducible on electronic devices.
Even more so, in the live performing arts, the presence of multilingual options on custom individual devices (Santa Fe Opera, 1998) or on mobile consumer devices (Teatro del Maggio Musicale Fiorentino, 2011)  or on hybrid solutions (Royal Opera House Muscat, 2012), makes the spatial connotation of the term "sur-titles" inappropriate.

Terminology
In both cases (performing arts that are reproducible on electronic devices and live performing arts), for a scientific approach the term "titling", broader and all-embracing, is preferable to define the work of linguistic mediation, without specifying whether the visualization is to be above (sur-titles) or below (sub-titles).

Sources
BARDI A., Parola cantata o recitata e parola scritta. Pensieri per i primi dieci anni di Prescott Studio, in Prescott Studio. 1996-2006: Catalogo delle produzioni. Dieci anni di sopratitoli in Italia e in Europa, pp. 11–13, Firenze-Scandicci, 2007
BESTENTE S., Buon compleanno, sopratitoli, 16 July 2008, in http://www.fierrabras.com/2008/07/16/buon-compleanno-sopratitoli/
COLOMBO S., ed., «Come si dice Wagner in italiano?» Rassegna stampa del debutto dei sopratitoli in Europa, in Prescott Studio. 1996-2006: Catalogo delle produzioni. Dieci anni di sopratitoli in Italia e in Europa, pp. 29–36, Firenze-Scandicci, 2007
CONTI M., Leggere voci. Il muto racconto dei sopratitoli, voce fuori campo del teatro, in Prescott Studio. 1996-2006: Catalogo delle produzioni. Dieci anni di sopratitoli in Italia e in Europa, pp. 15–24, Firenze-Scandicci, 2007
EUGENI C., Il Teatro d'opera e l'adattamento linguistico simultaneo, M.A. Thesis, Scuola Superiore di Lingue Moderne per Interpreti e Traduttori, University of Bologna, academic year 2002-2003
FOURNIER-FACIO G., Io c'ero. La prima volta dei sopratitoli in Italia, in Prescott Studio. 1996-2006: Catalogo delle produzioni. Dieci anni di sopratitoli in Italia e in Europa, p. 37, Firenze-Scandicci, 2007
FREDDI M. and LURAGHI S., Titling for the Opera House: a Test Case for Universals of Translations? in INCALCATERRA McLOUGHLIN L., BISCIO M. and NÍ MHAINNÍN, M. Á., eds., Audiovisual Translation. Subtitles and Subtitling: Theory and Practice, Bern-Berlin-New York: Peter Lang, 2010. See also the extensive Bibliography (in Appendix)
GAMBIER Y., Les transferts linguistiques dans les médias, Lilles: Presses Universitaires du Septentrion, 1996
GOTTLIEB H., Subtitling. A new University Discipline, in DOLLERUP C. e LODDEGAARD A., Eds., Teaching Translation and Interpreting, 1. Training, Talent and Experience, Amsterdam-Philadelphia: John Benjamins, 1992
HEISS C. e BOLLETTIERI BOSINELLI R. M., Traduzione multimediale per il cinema, la televisione e la scena, Bologna: Clueb, 1996
HUGHES P.J., The introduction of supertitles to opera, M.A. Thesis, Teachers College, Columbia University: New York 2003
MARSCHALL G.R., La traduction des livrets. Aspects théoriques, historiques et pragmatiques, actes du colloque international tenu en Sorbonne les 30 novembre, 1er et 2 décembre 200, sous la direction de Gottfried R. Marschall, Paris: Presses de l’Université Paris-Sorbonne, 2004
LURAGHI S., Sottotitoli per l'opera: strategie di semplificazione in un tipo speciale di traduzione, in «Studi italiani di linguistica teorica e applicata», 33 (1), Pisa: Pacini Editore, 2004
PAPARELLA S., I sopratitoli: metodi di traduzione e adattamento del testo, B.A. Thesis, Facoltà di Lettere e Filosofia, University of Pisa, advisor Mireille Gille, academic year 2003-2004
PEREGO E., Evidence of explication in subtitling: toward a categorisation, in «Across language and cultures», 4 (1), pp. 63–88, 2003
PEREGO E., La traduzione audiovisiva, Roma: Carocci, 2005. See also the extensive Bibliography (in Appendix), pp. 121–126
RACAMIER, M., Une vision d'ensemble du surtitrage d'opéra: vers la reconnaissance d'une nouvelle pratique de traduction?, Université de Toulouse II Le Mirail - University of Genua, Mémoire de deuxième année de Master Professionnel en Traduction et Interprétation «Proscenio»: Traduction technique, multimédia et arts de la scène, headmaster Margherita Orsino, co-headmaster Micaela Rossi, academic year 2011-2012
ROCCATAGLIATI A. and SALA E., Tradurre l'opera? Basta capirsi..., in «Il giornale della musica», No. 188, December 2002
SABLICH S., Wagner con le didascalie, Program notes, Die Meistersinger von Nürnberg, European début of surtitles, Florence, Teatro Comunale, 1 June 1986
SABLICH S., Tradurre all'epoca dei sopratitoli, in «Il giornale della musica», No. 188, December 2002
SESTITO M., Costumi di scena del tradurre, in Prescott Studio. 1996-2006: Catalogo delle produzioni.Dieci anni di sopratitoli in Italia e in Europa, pp. 25–27, Firenze-Scandicci, 2007
STAMPACCHIA E., Traduzione e sopratitolaggio. Il caso dell'opera lirica, M. A. Thesis, Facoltà di Lettere e Filosofia, University of Pavia, Silvia Luraghi advisor, academic year 2003-2004

Notes

Translation
Performing arts
Theatre
Film and video terminology
Musical terminology